Anthemis glaberrima is a species of flowering plant in the family Asteraceae.
It is found only in Greece.
Its natural habitats are rocky shores and Mediterranean-type shrubby vegetation (known as phrygana in Greece).

In 1992 it was designated as a 'priority species' under Annex II of the Habitats Directive of the European Community (which was reformed as the European Union the following year). This designation was meant to serve as the basis for Greece to declare which areas in which it occurs are 'Special Areas of Conservation' -which were to form the backbone of the Natura 2000 network, but only if these areas include one of the number of habitats listed in Annex I of the directive.

References

glaberrima
Flora of Greece
Plants described in 1943
Critically endangered plants
Taxonomy articles created by Polbot